Rosebank is a settlement in Prince Edward Island. It is an unincorporated area, located in Queens County in the central portion of Prince Edward Island, S. of Charlottetown.

History of the name 
The official history of the geographic name Rosebank:

Rosebank (Sett.) was adopted 18 November 1966 on 11L/3h. Status changed to Local ity when it became part of the Community of Southport in 1972. Rosebank (Locali ty) became part of the Town of Stratford on 1 April 1995. Name confirmed 17 June 1996 on 11L/3.

Source: http://www.gov.pe.ca/placefinder/index.php3?city=Rosebank

Communities in Queens County, Prince Edward Island